Fayez Rashid is a Palestinian political writer born in 1950 in the West Bank. He earned his Ph.D. in natural medicine and is a member of the General Union of Palestinian Writers and Journalists.

Biography 
Rashid was born in 1950 in the city of Qalqilya in the West Bank in Palestine (at the time under Jordanian rule). He earned his Ph.D. in natural medicine. He is a member of the Jordanian Medical Association and a member of the General Union of Palestinian Writers and Journalists. In 1970, the Israeli occupation authorities deported him to Jordan after two years of detention in Israeli prisons.

Rasheed is a political writer, novelist, short story writer, and researcher in strategic affairs. His research papers and articles have been published in various Arab magazines and newspapers. He is a member of the Jordanian Writers Association and a member of the General Union of Arab Writers and Writers, and he writes about the Palestinian and Arab-Israeli conflict.

Works 
"Al-Jarrah Tashhad, Memoirs of a Doctor in the Time of Siege", 1983.

"Falsification of history in response to Netanyahu's book: A Place Under the Sun", 1997.

"Fifty years after the Nakba", 1999.

"Wda'an Ayohal, Lilac", a collection of short stories, 2003.

"The Culture of Resistance", 2004.

"The Falsehood of Israel's Democracy", 2004.

"Guitart Lil", Arab Scientific Publishers.

"Laila Khaled in the eyes of some free women and men of the world", 2021.

References 

Palestine (region)
People from Qalqilya
Palestinian writers
1950 births
Living people